The Psammobiidae, or sunset clams, are a family of medium-sized saltwater clams, marine bivalve molluscs of the order Cardiida.

These genera are accepted by the database World Register of Marine Species:
Asaphis Modeer, 1793
Gari Schumacher, 1817
Heterodonax Mörch, 1853
Heteroglypta Martens in Möbius, 1880
Nuttallia Dall, 1900
Psammosphaerica Jousseaume, 1894
Psammotella Herrmannsen, 1852
Sanguinolaria Lamarck, 1799
Soletellina Blainville, 1824

References

External links
 ITIS
 Powell A. W. B., New Zealand Mollusca, William Collins Publishers Ltd, Auckland, New Zealand 1979 
 Glen Pownall, New Zealand Shells and Shellfish, Seven Seas Publishing Pty Ltd, Wellington, New Zealand 1979 
 Photographs of Psammobiidae specimens in the collection of Natural History Museum, Rotterdam. 

 
Bivalve families
Taxa named by John Fleming (naturalist)